Eddie Wu Kuang-yu or Wu Guangyu (born 1946) is a Chinese-Canadian t'ai chi ch'uan (taijiquan) teacher. He is the eldest son of the late Wu Ta-k'uei and senior instructor of the Wu family and "Gatekeeper" of the Wu-style as taught in the Wu's T'ai Chi Ch'uan Academies internationally since the death of his uncle, the late Wu Ta-hsin, in January 2005.

Biography
Eddie Wu is the great-grandson of the late Wu Chien-ch'uan, and grandson of the late Wu Kung-i. His two sons, Austin Wu Chung Him (吳仲謙, born 1972) and Edward Wu Chung Wai (吳仲偉, born 1974) are also instructors in their family's school.

Eddie Wu started learning t'ai chi at the age of 6 from his grandfather Wu Kung-i, with whom he lived till age 12. Thereafter, Eddie Wu moved back to live with his father Wu Ta-k'uei and continued learning until he left for university. He later graduated and worked as an engineer for several years.

In 1975, Wu Ta-ch'i (Wu Daqi) started the first western hemisphere Wu family school in Toronto, Canada. Shortly afterwards, he invited his thirty-year-old nephew Eddie Wu to take over the Toronto school's instruction.

Eddie Wu has promoted Wu-style t'ai chi ch'uan in Asia, North America and Europe, with schools that recognise his supervision in Toronto, Fredericton, Ann Arbor, Metropolitan Detroit, New Jersey, Hawaii, London (England), Hong Kong, Singapore, Greece and Malaysia. He is assisted by his sister Cynthia Wu Hsiao Fung (born 1949).

T'ai chi ch'uan lineage tree with Wu-style focus

External links
 Eddie Wu Biography from 2006 International Forum on Taijiquan
 International Wu Style Tai Chi Chuan Federation website
 Wu family tree
 Eddie Wu listed as chairman of the Confederation of Canadian Wushu Organizations
 

1946 births
Living people
Chinese tai chi practitioners
Manchu martial artists